G 1/84 is a decision of the Enlarged Board of Appeal of the European Patent Office (EPO), which was issued on July 24, 1985. The Board held in this decision that:
 "A notice of opposition against a European patent is not inadmissible merely because it has been filed by the proprietor of that patent."
The decision was overruled in G 9/93, a later decision in which the Enlarged Board held that a European patent cannot be opposed by its own proprietor.

External links 
 Decision G 1/84 on the "EPO boards of appeal decisions" section of the EPO web site
 Decision G 1/84 in the Official Journal of the EPO 1985, page 299
 

G 1984 1
1985 in case law
1985 in Europe